Marshall Wood (c. 1834 – 16 July 1882) was an English sculptor, medalist, and artist, and the younger brother of Shakespeare Wood.

Wood was born in Manchester, the son of Hamilton Wood (c.1805–1811), a merchant and manufacturer. He began showing work at the Royal Academy in 1854, and was a regular exhibitor for the next twenty years. He also showed work in Edinburgh in 1856. By 1871 his wife, children and two servants were resident in Reigate. The Art Journal credits Wood with having executed statues of Queen Victoria for Melbourne, Sydney, Montreal, Calcutta, and Ottawa. Wood also executed three portraits of the Prince of Wales (shown at the RA in 1863, 1864 and 1875) and a bust of the Princess of Wales.

Selected works 

 Daphne
 Hebe
 Musidora
 Proserpine
 Siren
 Song of the Shirt
 Queen Victoria, various locations, various dates
 Musée de la civilisation, Quebec City
 Richard Cobden, St Ann's Square, Manchester
 Albert Edward, Prince of Wales, 1863
 Alexandra, Princess of Wales, 1867
 Richard Cobden, 1867

References 

 Marshall Wood, Sculptor, 1834-1882, Lawrence Hayward.
 Public sculpture of Greater Manchester, Terry Wyke, Harry Cocks, Liverpool University Press, 2004, page 38. .
 "Late Mr Marshall Wood." July 28, 1882, Trove Digitised Newspapers and More.
 " Marshall Wood", Mapping the Practice and Profession of Sculpture in Britain and Ireland 1851-1951, University of Glasgow History of Art and HATII, online database 2011.
 Victorian Web article

External links

1834 births
1882 deaths
19th-century British sculptors
Artists from Manchester
English sculptors